Nikica Maglica (born 26 January 1965) is a Croatian former football player who was assistant manager of Dynamo Dresden from 2009 to 2011.

Club career
Born in Brčko, SR Bosnia and Herzegovina (back then part of Yugoslavia), he started playing at FK Bečej, before moving to FK Proleter Zrenjanin where he will play in the Yugoslav Second League until achieving promotion to the Yugoslav First League in 1990. He played with Proleter two more seasons in Yugoslav top tier before moving to Croatia in summer 1992 and played with NK Zagreb in the 1992–93 Croatian First League.

In 1993, he moved to Germany and since then he has played with Dynamo Dresden, Dresdner SC and OFC Neugersdorf.

Personal life
While living in Zrenjanin he married Sandra and has two daughters, Marina and Viktorija. After retiring from playing he became a coach.

References

External links
 

1965 births
Living people
People from Brčko District
Croats of Bosnia and Herzegovina
Association football defenders
Yugoslav footballers
Croatian footballers
OFK Bečej 1918 players
FK Proleter Zrenjanin players
NK Zagreb players
Dynamo Dresden players
Dynamo Dresden II players
Dresdner SC players
FC Oberlausitz Neugersdorf players
Yugoslav Second League players
Yugoslav First League players
Croatian Football League players
Bundesliga players
Croatian expatriate footballers
Expatriate footballers in Germany
Croatian expatriate sportspeople in Germany
Dynamo Dresden non-playing staff